Die Slaughterhaus Records is a record company based in Atlanta, Georgia, that includes punk rock acts such as Deerhunter, Black Lips, Carbonas, CPC Gangbangs, Frantic, Coathangers, Die Rotzz, and Hipshakes. Founded in 2001, Die Slaughterhaus began as a venue for punk rock shows, and it quickly became a popular place to see live music in Atlanta.

See also

http://www.dieslaughterhausrecords.com.

American record labels